Universidad del Desarrollo (Spanish for "University for development") is a Chilean private university, one of the most expensive universities in the region. Its main campus is in Santiago de Chile, with a secondary campus in Concepción.

History of Universidad del Desarrollo (UDD)

The University was founded in Concepción in 1990, in the residence of a well known family, located in the Trinitarias Street in downtown Concepción. Its founders were Joaquín Lavín, Carlos Délano, Ernesto Silva, Cristián Larroulet, Hernán Büchi and Federico Valdés.

The first degree given was in Business Administration (Ingeniería comercial). The following year, architecture, journalism were added and a law school opened.

In 1993, its main campus was inaugurated. The following year programs for industrial engineering and social sciences were opened. In 1997, the university gained autonomy from the Catholic University of Chile. Two years later, the university opened a new campus, while absorbing the Universidad de Las Condes, and its student body.

In 2001, the university inaugurated its new campus in San Carlos de Apoquindo, where most of the faculties are. Notable exceptions, are the Medical School and the Drama School, both of which are in the old Universidad de Las Condes house.

In 2006, the university opened its newest building for the Health Area Faculties in Concepción; located less than one block away from the main campus.

Rankings 
UDD`s MBA faculty was ranked first in Latin America by América Economía, one of Latin America's most important business magazines. Its MBA program was also ranked 12th among all Latin American business schools. América Economía magazine also ranked UDD in first place in developing entrepreneurship and leading abilities to its students within Latin American universities.

In 2017 UDD's Medicine School was ranked second in Chile in the national medical exam, surpassing most traditional universities in Chile. Besides, UDD is currently ranked as the best private university in Chile, standing 5th overall, according to the national CNAP accreditation program.

Sports
UDD features football, hockey, volleyball, rodeo, tennis and basketball teams, competing within higher education leagues and championships.

Accreditation

The University applied and got accreditation for five years in 2006, in the areas of Institutional Management, Degree-Conducing Teaching, Vinculation with the Environment, and Continuous Education.

Schools and careers
Faculty of Architecture, Arts and Design
Architecture
Environments and Objects Design
Digital Design
Graphic Design
Faculty of Communications
Journalism
Drama
Advertising
Cinema
Law School
Law
Faculty of Business and Economy
Business Administration (Ingeniería Comercial)
Administration Execution Engineering
Faculty of Humanities and Social Studies
Baccalaureate in Science
Baccalaureate in Humanities and Social Studies
Faculty of Government
Political Sciences
Faculty of Engineering
Industrial Engineering
Civil Engineering
Mining Engineering
Geology (Earth Science)
Faculty of Health
Medicine
Medical Technologies
Speech-language pathology
Kinesiology
Nutrition and Dietetics
Odontology
Faculty of Psychology
Psychology
Faculty of Education
Pedagogy

References

External links 

 Official site

Universities in Chile
Desarrollo
Concepción, Chile
1990 establishments in Chile
Universities in Biobío Region